Maud Marian Wear (8 December 1873 – 1955) was a  British artist, known as a painter and miniaturist.

Biography
Wear was born in London to a local women and a wine merchant's clerk from Yorkshire, who late became a newspaper correspondent. Wear was raised in Hackney and privately educated at Eastbourne before entering the Royal Academy Schools in 1896. During her five years at the Academy Schools, Wear won a silver medal for a painting of the draped figure. Subsequently, she combined teaching at the London County Council Central School of Arts and Crafts with an exhibition career that was noted for its portraits and figure studies. Wear showed a total of 45 works at the Royal Academy in London and also exhibited with the New English Art Club, the International Society of Sculptors, Painters and Gravers, the Royal Miniature Society and at the Glasgow Art Gallery, the Walker Art Gallery in Liverpool and the Paris Salon. For a time, Wear lived at Blockley in Gloucestershire but moved between several locations in southern England during her life and died at Hove in East Sussex.

References

1873 births
1955 deaths
19th-century English women artists
20th-century English women artists
19th-century English painters
20th-century English painters
Alumni of the Royal Academy Schools
Artists from London
People from Hackney, London
Portrait miniaturists